Luckyboy Mokoena (born 12 December 1993) is a South African soccer player who plays as a defender.

Club career
Mokoena played youth football with Mpumalanga Black Aces, Kaizer Chiefs and Bidvest Wits, before playing senior football for Mpumalanga Black Aces, Chippa United, Garankuwa United, Ubuntu Cape Town, Real Kings and Highlands Park.

International career
Mokoena has previously played for South Africa at under-20 level. In 2019, he was called up to the South Africa national football team.

References

1993 births
Living people
South African soccer players
South Africa youth international soccer players
Association football defenders
Mpumalanga Black Aces F.C. players
Kaizer Chiefs F.C. players
Bidvest Wits F.C. players
Chippa United F.C. players
Garankuwa United F.C. players
Ubuntu Cape Town F.C. players
Real Kings F.C. players
Highlands Park F.C. players
South African Premier Division players
National First Division players